Jape is a configurable, graphical proof assistant, originally developed by Richard Bornat at Queen Mary, University of London and Bernard Sufrin the University of Oxford.   It allows user to define a logic, decide how to view proofs, and much more. It works with variants of the sequent calculus and natural deduction.

It is claimed that Jape is the most popular program for "computer-assisted logic teaching" that involves exercises in developing proofs in mathematical logic.

The program is available for the Mac, Unix, and Windows operating systems. It is written in the Java programming language and released under the GNU GPL.

See also
 List of proof assistants

References

External links
 Jape Online official distribution website
 Jape SourceForge portal

Proof assistants
Free theorem provers